Urdadalstindene is a mountain ridge in Lom Municipality in Innlandet county, Norway. The other peaks include Midtre Urdadalstinden, Søre Urdadalstinden, and Sørevestre Urdadalstinden. The mountains are located south of the Visdalen valley in the Jotunheimen mountains within Jotunheimen National Park. The mountains are surrounded by several other notable mountains including Nørdre Hellstugutinden, Midtre Hellstugutinden, Store Hellstugutinden, Nestsøre Hellstugutinden, and Søre Hellstugutinden to the east; Semeltinden to the southwest; and Langvasshøi, Visbretinden, and Semelholstinden to the west.

See also
List of mountains of Norway by height

References

Jotunheimen
Lom, Norway
Mountains of Innlandet